Little Rock Air Force Base  is a United States Air Force base located approximately  northeast of Little Rock, Arkansas.

Little Rock AFB is the primary C-130 Hercules training base for the Department of Defense, training C-130 pilots, navigators, flight engineers, and loadmasters from all branches of the US military in tactical airlift and aerial delivery. It is home to C-130H and C-130J aircraft, as well as the C-130 Center of Excellence (i.e., schools for C-130H and C-130J crews).

The host unit at Little Rock AFB is the 19th Airlift Wing (19 AW), assigned to the Air Mobility Command's 18th Air Force. The wing provides the Department of Defense the largest C-130 Hercules transport fleet in the world, supplying humanitarian airlift relief to victims of disasters, as well as airdropping supplies and troops into the heart of contingency operations in hostile areas.

Other organizations at Little Rock AFB include the 189th Airlift Wing of the Arkansas Air National Guard, and the C-130 division of the U.S. Air Force Weapons School. All of these organizations fly the C-130 Hercules.

Little Rock Air Force Base is the fourth largest employer in the state of Arkansas, with a local economic impact of $813.6 million.

History 
Little Rock Air Force Base was authorized in 1953 and construction began on 6 November 1953.

The base opened on 24 January 1955 with 6,100 acres donated by landowners, valued at $1.2 million in 1952. Communications and several storage buildings, JATO facility, ordnance igloos, track and loading platform were completed by 30 June 1955, and the base was opened to limited air traffic on 9 September 1955. The base headquarters facility was accepted 31 January 1956, and all runways and other operational concrete areas were completed by January 1957.

The base was officially activated by Strategic Air Command (SAC) on 1 August 1955, hosting SAC's 384th Bombardment Wing (384 BW) flying the Boeing B-47E Stratojet, and the 70th Reconnaissance Wing (70 RW) flying the RB-47 Stratojet and KC-97 Stratofreighter.

In 1960, the Air Force announced that Little Rock Air Force Base would house 18 Titan II Intercontinental Ballistic Missiles located throughout the state of Arkansas. In 1961, the 70 RW was redesignated as the 70th Bombardment Wing (Medium) and converted to the B-47, but was inactivated the following year before being declared combat-ready.

In September 1962, the 154th Tactical Reconnaissance Squadron of the Arkansas Air National Guard relocated to Little Rock AFB and reorganized as the 189th Tactical Reconnaissance Group (189 TRG).

In October 1962, the 384th Bomb Wing deployed 11 Boeing B-47 Stratojet aircraft to civilian municipal airports around the nation for dispersal alert purposes during the Cuban Missile Crisis. Also in 1962, SAC established the 308th Strategic Missile Wing (308 SMW) as the host organization for Little Rock AFB's Titan II missile operations, with the first of the Titan II missiles installed at a site in Searcy, Arkansas in February 1963.

In September 1964, the 384th Bomb Wing inactivated following the retirement of the B-47 from front-line service in SAC. That same year, SAC's 43d Bombardment Wing transferred from Carswell AFB, Texas with its B-58 Hustler supersonic aircraft. The 43d Bomb Wing would continue to operate at Little Rock until the B-58s were withdrawn from operational service in January 1970.

In June 1965, Little Rock's 189 TRG became the first Air National Guard unit to operate the RF-101 Voodoo and by December, had assumed the RF-101 Replacement Training Unit (RTU) mission for the entire Air Force. The same year, the base and associated flying units also participated in various relief efforts such as a tornado that ripped through Conway, Arkansas in April and Hurricane Betsy in Louisiana in September.

In the 1970s the base went through significant changes, with the first C-130 Hercules aircraft arriving in March 1970. 
On 31 March 1970, Little Rock Air Force Base officially transferred from SAC to Tactical Air Command (TAC), with TAC's 314th Tactical Airlift Wing (314 TAW) taking over host wing responsibilities. 
Although SAC's 308 SMW and its Titan II ICBMs continued to be a major tenant, the base's primary mission became C-130 tactical airlift operations and training, with two operational C-130 squadrons assigned and two C-130 training squadrons assigned. 
In 1974, following the divestiture of C-130 tactical airlift aircraft from TAC, both the 314 TAW and Little Rock AFB transferred from TAC control to that of the Military Airlift Command (MAC).

On 1 January 1976, the 189 TRG transferred being a TAC-gained unit to a SAC-gained unit when it converted to the KC-135 Stratotanker and was redesignated the 189th Air Refueling Group (189 ARG), becoming one of the first Air National Guard units to be assigned to Strategic Air Command with a concomitant requirement to maintain a 24-hour alert force at Little Rock as well as deployments to support worldwide tanker task forces.

Damascus incident

On 18 September 1980, an airman conducting maintenance on a USAF Titan II missile at Little Rock Air Force Base's Launch Complex 374-7 in Southside (Van Buren County), just north of Damascus, Arkansas, dropped a socket which fell impacting the rocket's first stage fuel tank resulting in a leak.
In response, evacuations were made in the area.
The leaking fuel exploded on 19 September. 
An Air Force airman was killed and the launch complex was destroyed.

Recent years
On 1 October 1986, the 189 ARG saw yet another mission change when it was redesignated as the 189th Tactical Airlift Group (189 TAG) and converted to the C-130 aircraft, with transfer of operational claimancy to MAC.

During the 1991 Gulf War, the 314 TAW's two operational C-130 squadrons and the 189 TAG's C-130 squadron supported operations from both the middle east and European theaters. Later that year, the 314th Tactical Airlift Wing was redesignated as the 314th Airlift Wing (314 AW), and following the disestablishment of MAC in 1992, the base and the 314 AW were transferred to the new Air Mobility Command (AMC). The 189 TAG was also redesignated as the 189th Airlift Group (189 AG) the same year, followed by redesignation as the 189th Airlift Wing (189 AW) in 1995.

In 1993, the base and the 314 AW transferred to Air Combat Command (ACC), as part the U.S. Air Force's decision to transfer continental U.S.-based C-130s from AMC to ACC. In 1997, the U.S. Air Force reversed this decision, returning most C-130 airlift back to AMC claimancy. However, given the 314 AW's primary training mission as the Formal Training Unit (FTU) for C-130s, the base and the 314 AW were transferred to the Air Education and Training Command (AETC), and the base's two operational Regular Air Force C-130 squadrons were organized under the 463d Airlift Group, an AMC unit.

From the mid-1990s to the late 1990s, the 314 AW and the 463 AG supported the air war over Serbia and since the September 11, 2001 attacks, the 463 AG has supported both Operation Enduring Freedom and Operation Iraqi Freedom until the 463 AG was inactivated on 1 October 2008.

In its 50-year history, Little Rock Air Force Base has been operated by six Air Force Major Commands (MAJCOMs): SAC, TAC, MAC, AMC, ACC, and AETC. 
These represent every possible MAJCOM a continental U.S.-based operational flying base could have been assigned to except for the former Air Defense Command/Aerospace Defense Command (ADC), Air Force Systems Command (AFSC), and the current Air Force Global Strike Command (AFGSC).

In 2012, First Lady Michelle Obama visited the Little Rock base to mark the second anniversary of the Let's Move initiative.

Major commands to which assigned

Strategic Air Command, 1 February 1955
Tactical Air Command, 1 April 1970
Military Airlift Command, 1 December 1974
Air Mobility Command, 1 June 1992 – 1 July 1993; 1 April 1997 – present

 Attached to: Air Education and Training Command, 1 April 1997 – present

Air Combat Command, 1 July 1993 – 1 April 1997

Major units assigned

 70th Strategic Reconnaissance Wing, 24 January 1955 – 25 October 1961
 Redesignated: 70th Bombardment Wing, 25 October 1961 – 25 June 1962
 384th Bombardment Wing, 1 August 1955 – 1 September 1965
 825th Air Division, 1 August 1955 – 1 June 1962
 Redesignated: 825 Strategic Aerospace Division, 1 June 1962 – 1 April 1970
 308th Strategic Missile Wing, 1 April 1962 – 18 August 1987
 189th Airlift Wing (various designations), 1 October 1962 – present
 43d Bombardment Wing, 1 September 1964 – 31 January 1970
 64th Tactical Airlift Wing, 9 March 1970 – 30 May 1971

 314th Tactical Airlift Wing, 1 April 1971 – 1974
 Redesignated: 314th Military Airlift Wing, 1974 – 1991
 Redesignated: 314th Airlift Wing, 1991 – present
 834th Airlift Division, 1 January 1972 – 31 December 1974
 34th Tactical Airlift Training Group, 15 September 1978 – 1 December 1991
 463d Airlift Group, 1 April 1997 – 1 October 2008
 United States Air Force Mobility Weapons School, 3 February 2003 – present
 19th Airlift Wing, 1 October 2008 – present
 913th Airlift Group, 13 July 2014 – present

Aircraft assigned (Strategic Air Command)

Boeing B-47 Stratojet (bomber)
Convair B-58 Hustler (supersonic bomber)
Boeing KC-97 Stratofreighter (aerial refueling aircraft)
Boeing KC-135 Stratotanker (aerial refueling aircraft)

Role and operations

Little Rock Air Force Base is the home of the 19th Airlift Wing, the host unit. There are also two major associate units located here, the 314th Airlift Wing reports to Air Education and Training Command, and the C-130 division of the U.S. Air Force Weapons School reports to Air Combat Command. Additionally, the 189th Airlift Wing of the Arkansas Air National Guard is located here. The 189th AW also reports to Air Education and Training Command.

19th Airlift Wing 

 19th Operations Group
 Provides and sustains combatant commands with precise and responsive theater combat aerial delivery. The group trains and develops Airmen to lead the Air Force and innovates and shapes future combat aerial delivery options. The 19th Operations Group is composed of two flying squadrons—the 41st and 61st Airlift Squadrons. The 41st is the Air Force's first active-duty combat-ready C-130J squadron. These squadrons are operational and deploy throughout the world.
 19th Mission Support Group
 The 19th Mission Support Group encompasses the support and logistic functions for the base. The group includes contracting, civil engineer, communications, security forces, force support and the logistic readiness squadrons.
 19th Maintenance Group
 Deploys and trains C-130 maintainers and aircraft. The 19th Maintenance Group’s goal in completing that mission are to deploy mission-ready combat airlifters, support AETC’s training mission with maintenance, generate maintained C-130s in order to execute combat airlift, support AMC partners with T-56 engines and develop C-130 Isochronal Inspection process.
 19th Medical Group
 The 19th Medical Group offers family practice, pediatrics and flight medicine clinics that will provide the bulk of care. The 19th Medical Group  also has women's health, physical therapy, optometry, life skills, and dental clinics along with a full array of diagnostic services and prevention programs. For specialty medical services not available in the immediate medical facility, the 19th have partnered with doctors and hospitals in the area.
 314th Airlift Wing
 Directly reporting to Nineteenth Air Force at Randolph Air Force Base, Texas, the 314th Airlift Wing is composed of one C-130 flying squadron—the 62nd Airlift Squadron. It is the premier C-130 training base in the Department of Defense, training C-130 crew members from all branches of the service and the U.S. Coast Guard.
 314th Operations Group
 The 314th Operations Group is a united team of diverse professionals providing the best training, airpower support and functional expertise for the 314th Airlift Wing mission through personal commitment to excellence. The 314th Operations Group mission is to train world-class, combat capable aircrews to sustain global airlift operations. The 314th Operations Group vision is to develop combat leaders of all ranks, support the warfighter, and develop world's premier C-130 and C-21 centers of excellence.
 314th Maintenance Group
 The 314th Maintenance Group provides direct support for the wing's primary mission forces, an AMC operational group and the Mobility Weapons School. The group’s mission includes direct sortie production, aircraft equipment support, aircraft preventive maintenance and inspections, component repair, maintenance training, and health of the fleet management. The group mission statement is: "Supporting the United States Air Force and worldwide C-130 community by providing the highest quality aircraft maintenance for aircrew initial qualification and continuation training." The group is composed of a command staff element and two reporting squadrons; 314th Maintenance Operations Squadron and 314th Aircraft Maintenance Squadron.

Air National Guard and Air Reserve operations 

 189th Airlift Wing (Arkansas ANG)
 The Arkansas Air National Guard's 189th Airlift Wing is located on Little Rock Air Force Base and is aligned in the standard combat wing organization with the 189th AW headquarters staff, 189th Operations Group, 189th Maintenance Group, 189th Mission Support Group and the 189th Medical Group. The wing provides support to five geographically separated units: the Arkansas Air National Guard headquarters, the 123rd Intelligence Squadron and the 154th Weather Flight on Little Rock AFB, the 223rd Combat Communications Squadron in Hot Springs, Arkansas, and the National Guard Marksmanship Training Center at Camp Joseph T. Robinson in North Little Rock, Arkansas.
 913th Airlift Group (Air Force Reserve Command)
 The 913th Airlift Group is part of the 22nd Air Force, Air Force Reserve Command. The group began as the 22nd Air Force Detachment 1, activated October 2010.  The detachment was re-designated the 913th Airlift Group on July 13, 2014.  The group provides C-130J combat airlift capability on a world-wide scale, becoming a Reserve associate of the 19th Airlift Wing, Little Rock AFB, Ark., in December 2015. The mission of the 913th is to "Train, ready and support the world's best warrior airman to project dominant and globally responsive tactical airlift." In addition, the 913th Airlift Group has extensive global reach capabilities, capable of an array of operational missions.
 96th APS (Air Force Reserve Command)
 Little Rock Air Force Base is also home to the 96th Aerial Port Squadron also known as the "Combat Hogs", assigned to the 913th Airlift Group.  Established in 1975, the 142 authorized personnel are one of the most recognized Aerial port squadrons in AFRC (Air Force Reserve Command). The 96th augments the 19th yearly to fill vacancies due to their AEF (Aerospace Expeditionary Force) commitments. The mission of the aerial port is to provide Citizen Airmen to defend the United States and protect its interests through air space and power and to prepare qualified individuals to deploy and perform Aerial Port Operations anywhere, at any time in support of Air Force global airlift operations.

Based units 
Flying and notable non-flying units based at Little Rock Air Force Base.

Units marked GSU are Geographically Separate Units, which, although based at Little Rock, are subordinate to a parent unit based at another location.

United States Air Force 

Air Mobility Command (AMC)

 Eighteenth Air Force
 19th Airlift Wing (host wing)
 19th Operations Group
 19th Operations Support Squadron
 34th Combat Training Squadron
 41st Airlift Squadron – C-130J Super Hercules
 61st Airlift Squadron – C-130J Super Hercules
 19th Maintenance Group
 19th Medical Group
 19th Aeromedical Dental Squadron
 19th Aerospace Medicine Squadron
 19th Healthcare Operations Squadron 
 19th Mission Support Group

Air Force Reserve Command (AFRC)

 Twenty-Second Air Force
 913th Airlift Group
 96th Aerial Port Squadron
 327th Airlift Squadron – C-130J Super Hercules
 913th Aerospace Medical Squadron
 913th Force Support Squadron
 913th Maintenance Squadron
 913th Operations Support Squadron

Air National Guard (ANG)

 Arkansas Air National Guard
 189th Airlift Wing
 189th Operations Group
 154th Training Squadron – C-130H Hercules
 189th Maintenance Group
 189th Medical Group 
 189th Mission Support Group

Air Education and Training Command (AETC)

 Second Air Force
 82nd Training Wing
 982nd Training Group
 373rd Training Squadron
 Detachment 4 (GSU)
 Nineteenth Air Force
 314th Airlift Wing
 314th Operations Group
 62nd Airlift Squadron – C-130J Super Hercules
 714th Training Squadron
 314th Maintenance Group
 314th Maintenance Squadron
 314th Aircraft Maintenance Squadron
 314th Maintenance Operations Squadron
 314th Mission Support Group
 314th Civil Engineer Squadron
 314th Communications Squadron
 314th Contracting Squadron
 314th Logistics Readiness Squadron
 314th Mission Support Squadron
 314th Security Forces Squadron
 314th Services Squadron
 314th Medical Group
 314th Medical Operations Squadron
 314th Medical Support Squadron

Air Combat Command (ACC)

 US Air Force Warfare Center 
 57th Wing 
 USAF Weapons School
 29th Weapons Squadron (GSU) – C-130H Hercules and C-130J Super Hercules

See also 

 List of United States Air Force installations

References

Bibliography
 
 
 Maurer, Maurer. Air Force Combat Units of World War II. Washington, DC: U.S. Government Printing Office 1961 (republished 1983, Office of Air Force History).
 Ravenstein, Charles A. Air Force Combat Wings Lineage and Honors Histories 1947–1977. Maxwell Air Force Base, Alabama: Office of Air Force History 1984. .
 Mueller, Robert, Air Force Bases Volume I, Active Air Force Bases Within the United States of America on 17 September 1982, Office of Air Force History, 1989
 Brief History of Little Rock Air Force Base (source of history)

Further reading

External links

 
 
 

Installations of the United States Air Force in Arkansas
Airports in Arkansas
Installations of the United States Air National Guard
Installations of Strategic Air Command
Transportation in Pulaski County, Arkansas
Buildings and structures in Pulaski County, Arkansas
1955 establishments in Arkansas